Oscar A. Jofre Jr. (born October 20, 1965) is a Chilean-born, Canadian entrepreneur and technology specialist, the founder of Ottawa-based The BabelFish Corporation (January 1999), and a SaaS-based multilingual translation portal.

In 1996, Jofre co-founded the Canadian Network of Language Industries Network (CLIN-RCIL), and sat on its Sectoral Committee. He undertook these activities as a response to a federal government mandate to bring the language industry together.  From 2002–2003, he sat on the steering committee of the Language Industry Technology Roadmap (LITR), an initiative set in motion by Industry Canada and the National Research Council of Canada, whose aim was to “identify the stakeholders in this industry, determine their profile, pinpoint growth sectors, take stock of Canadian research in those fields, and suggest measures to ensure a leadership position at the international level”.  Jofre was also the only Canadian on the United Nations/MIT Digital Nations Board (1999–2002), whose first mandate was to explore Esperanto.

In 2003, Jofre founded BoardSuite, a SaaS-based, secure web application-collaborative platform, also known as a board portal, which stores and manages board documents, and addresses board issues having to do with compliance and transparent governance.

In 2016, Oscar A. Jofre Jr. and Jason Futko founded KoreConX, a solution to manage companies’ capital market activity and stakeholder communications.

Notes

Businesspeople from Ontario
Businesspeople in computing
Living people
1965 births